Äratus (English: Awakening) is a 1989 Estonian historical drama film directed by Jüri Sillart.

Plot
The film chronicles the lives of Estonian villagers during "Operation Priboi"; the 25 to 28 March 1949 Soviet mass deportation of more than 90,000 Estonians, Latvians and Lithuanians labeled as "enemies of the people" to forced settlements in inhospitable areas of the Soviet Union.

Production
The manuscript of the film was written by writer and playwright Rein Saluri and presented to Tallinnfilm editor Tiina Lokk in late 1986 or early 1987. Lokk liked the manuscript, but was initially dissuaded by other employees at Tallinnfilm from pursuing the project. In 1989, the editorial board at Tallinnfilm granted Lokk permission to turn the manuscript into a film. Arvo Kruusement was the first choice to direct the film, however, he disliked the material. Jüri Sillart, who had worked as a cameraman and cinematographer up to that point in his career, showed an interest in the material and was hired as the director. Historian Mart Laar interviewed subjects who were deported to Siberia in the late 1940s for research and the manuscript was finalized on Hiiumaa by Saluri and Sillart.

The filmmakers later recounted that they were surprised that it was not difficult to make a film about the deportations during the end of the Soviet era. Russian conscripts were even hired from their military base at Tapa as extras in the film. When the film was completed, Lokk, Sillart, and Saluri took the film in a taxi to the All-Union Cinema Committee in Moscow for review. Neither Lokk nor Sillart remember any reproach by Soviet authorities there.

Cast
 Tõnu Kark as Voldemar Rass
 Sulev Luik as I Linnamees
 Kaljo Kiisk as Mõistuse Jaan
 Maria Klenskaja as Linnanaine
 Jaan Rekkor as Peeter Kängsepp
 Anne Paluver as Salme Peterson
 Arvo Kukumägi as Kaarel Peterson
 Väino Laes as Saareaugu Arnold
 Ülle Kaljuste as Saareaugu Aliide
 Mati Klooren as Richard Sass
 Feliks Kark as Ants Tammemets 
 Katrin Kohv as Vennaru Linda
 Rein Oja as II Vallamees
 Hilja Varem as Nuudimäe Armelde
 Elle Kull as Antsurahva Leida
 Kaie Mihkelson as I Naine
 Kaarin Raid as Maanaine
 Hannes Kaljujärv as Komsorg

Accolades
Awards, nominations, participations:
 1989: Monstra Internationale del Film d'Auttore (San Remo, Italy). Special Jury Prize
 1990: Espoo Ciné International Film Festival (Finland). Nyrki Tapiovaara Award
 1990: Riga International Film Festival (Latvia), Participation. Main Program
 1990: Edinburgh International Film Festival (Scotland, UK). Participation, Main Program
 2001: Baltic Film Festival (Gotland, Sweden). Participation, Main Program

References

External links
 
 Äratus, entry in Estonian Film Database (EFIS)

1989 films
Estonian drama films
Estonian-language films
Tallinnfilm films
Soviet-era Estonian films